"Live Fast, Love Hard, Die Young" was Faron Young's first number-one song and his fifth consecutive top ten hit. It spent three weeks at the top of the Billboard country music chart in 1955.

Background
"This was a tune I detested", Young said. "Ken Nelson made me record this song.  I put it out and it was a big, big hit. Then I got to liking it." The song mentions a Wampus cat.

The song idea came to Joe Allison while watching a gangster movie starring a young John Derek. Allison explained, "All through this picture he said, 'I want to die young and leave a good-looking corpse.' It struck me as a good idea for a song, so I wrote 'Live Fast, Love Hard, Die Young.' I didn't write it for anybody, but when Ken Nelson heard it, he said, 'We'll do that with Faron Young.'"

Cover versions
 A 1955 version by Eddie Cochran was released in 1997 on the album Rockin' It Country Style.
 Nick Lowe released a version of the song on his 1984 album Nick Lowe and His Cowboy Outfit.

Popular culture
Live Fast, Love Hard: The Faron Young Story is a 2007 biography written by Diane Diekman and published by the University of Illinois Press.

References 

1955 songs
Songs written by Joe Allison
Faron Young songs
Eddie Cochran songs
Nick Lowe songs